This is a list of U.S. cities (or census-designated areas) named for the state in which they are located.  Locations which are no longer functioning cities (including former cities and present ghost towns) are marked with an asterisk (*).

Alabama City, Alabama*
Arizona City, Arizona*
Arkansas City, Arkansas
California City, California
Colorado City, Colorado*
Colorado Springs, Colorado
Delaware City, Delaware
Florida City, Florida
Idaho City, Idaho
Idaho Falls, Idaho
Illinois City, Illinois*
Indianapolis, Indiana
Iowa City, Iowa
Jersey City, New Jersey
Kansas City, Kansas
Maryland City, Maryland*
Minneapolis, Minnesota
Minnesota City, Minnesota
Mississippi City, Mississippi*
Missouri City, Missouri
Montana City, Montana
Nebraska City, Nebraska
Nevada City, Nevada*
Adaven, Nevada*
New York Mills, New York
New York City, New York
Ohio City, Ohio*
Oklahoma City, Oklahoma
Oregon City, Oregon
Tennessee City, Tennessee*
Tennessee Ridge, Tennessee
Texas City, Texas
Utah City, Utah* 
Virginia City, Virginia*
Virginia Beach, Virginia
Wisconsin Dells, Wisconsin
Wisconsin Rapids, Wisconsin

Named after their state